Juan Serrahima (29 June 1905 – 11 October 1959) was a Spanish sprinter. He competed in the men's 100 metres at the 1928 Summer Olympics.

References

1905 births
1959 deaths
Athletes (track and field) at the 1928 Summer Olympics
Spanish male sprinters
Olympic athletes of Spain
Athletes from Barcelona